David William Egerton (19 October 1961 – 8 February 2021) was an English rugby union international who represented England from 1988 to 1990. At club level, Egerton played for Bath Rugby between 1985 and 1995. After retiring, Egerton worked as a coach for Bristol United and Bridgwater & Albion.

Early life
David Egerton was born on 19 October 1961 in Pinner, Middlesex, and from 1973 to 1980 attended Bishop Wordsworth's School.

Rugby union career
Egerton primarily played as a number 8. Whilst at Loughborough University, he played for English Universities and England Students rugby teams.

Egerton made 163 appearances for Bath Rugby between 1985 and 1995. He won five league titles, and five cup competitions with Bath, and helped them win the 1990 Pilkington Cup. He averaged one try every three games for Bath. He also played for the Barbarians, making his debut for the club in the 1990 Lisbon Sevens tournament.

Egerton made his international debut for England on 23 April 1988 at Lansdowne Road  against Ireland. Of the seven matches he played for the national side he was on the winning side on five occasions. He scored one international try, against Ireland in 1990. He was selected in the England squads for the 1987 and 1991 Rugby World Cups, but both times had to withdraw due to injury. He also played for the British and Irish Lions team which defeated France at Parc des Princes in October 1989. Egerton played his final match for England on 4 August 1990 at José Amalfitani Stadium against Argentina.

Post-retirement
After retiring as a player, Egerton became head coach of Bridgwater & Albion. He scouted Richard Hill, who went to the same secondary school as Egerton had, and invited him to a Bath training session. Ahead of the 1997–98 season, Egerton joined Bristol United as a coach. In February 1998, Egerton became joint caretaker coach of Bristol, alongside Darryl Jones. The next month, he was appointed an assistant coach. He left the role during the 1998–99 season for personal reasons.

Egerton later commentated for BBC Radio Bristol, and also worked in investment management in Hong Kong. Egerton returned to the United Kingdom in 2016, and lived in Clifton, Bristol.

Death
Egerton died on 8 February 2021 after being hospitalised with COVID-19 during the COVID-19 pandemic in England.

References

1961 births
2021 deaths
Alumni of Loughborough University
Barbarian F.C. players
Bath Rugby players
British & Irish Lions rugby union players from England
Deaths from the COVID-19 pandemic in England
England international rugby union players
English rugby union players
Loughborough Students RUFC players
People educated at Bishop Wordsworth's School
People from Pinner
Rugby union number eights
Rugby union players from Pinner